The British film industry produced over fifty major feature films in 2015. This article fully lists all films that have a release date in that year and which were at least partly made by the United Kingdom. It does not include films first released in previous years that had release dates in 2015.  Also included is an overview of the major events in British film, including film festivals and awards ceremonies, as well as lists of those films that have been particularly well received, both critically and financially. The year was particularly notable for a number of box office bombs, such as Jupiter Ascending, Pan, Fantastic Four and Mortdecai.

Major releases

January – March

April – June

July – September

October – December

Other releases

 51 Degrees North
 A Patch of Fog
 Aaaaaaaah!
 Aashiqui (with India)
 Afua's Diary
 Age of Kill
 Amar Akbar & Tony
 Angels vs Bullies
 Arthur and Merlin
 Black & Blue: The Paul Canoville Story
 Bone in the Throat (with the United States)
 Bone Tomahawk (with the United States)
 Born to Be Blue (with Canada and the United States)
 Brash Young Turks
 Cemetery of Splendour (with Thailand, Germany, France, Malaysia, South Korea, Mexico, the United States and Norway)
 Concussion (with Australia and the United States)
 Cream
 Creditors (with Spain)
 Curse of the Witching Tree
 Dark Summer (with the United States)
 Definition of Fear
 Demonic (with the United States)
 Youth (with Italy, France and Switzerland)

Co-productions

Highest-grossing films

Listed here are the highest-grossing British films of 2015 so far, with their total earnings listed in British pound sterling. It includes films released in previous years that made money in 2015, particularly those that had minor releases in 2014 but their main releases in 2015.

Critical reception

British award winners

Listed here are the British winners and nominees at the five most prestigious film award ceremonies in the English-speaking world: the Academy Awards, British Academy Film Awards, Critics' Choice Awards, Golden Globe Awards and Screen Actors Guild Awards, that were held during 2015, celebrating the best films of 2014. The British nominations were led by The Theory of Everything, The Grand Budapest Hotel, The Imitation Game and Selma, with The Grand Budapest Hotel going on to win large numbers of technical awards, whilst Eddie Redmayne and Julianne Moore won multiple best leading actor and leading actress awards for The Theory of Everything and Still Alice respectively. British films did, however, notably lose out to Boyhood and Birdman (both from the United States).

Academy Awards
The 87th Academy Awards honoring the best films of 2014 were held on 22 February 2015.

British winners:

 Ida (Best Foreign Language Film)
 Interstellar (Best Visual Effects)
 Room (Best Actress)
 The Grand Budapest Hotel (Best Original Score, Best Production Design, Best Makeup and Hairstyling, Best Costume Design)
 The Imitation Game (Best Adapted Screenplay)
 The Phone Call (Best Live Action Short Film)
 The Theory of Everything (Best Actor)
 Andrew Lockley (Best Visual Effects) - Interstellar
 Ben Wilkins (Best Sound Mixing) - Whiplash
 Eddie Redmayne (Best Actor) - The Theory of Everything
 Julianne Moore (Best Actress) - Still Alice
 Mark Coulier (Best Makeup and Hairstyling) - The Grand Budapest Hotel
 Mat Kirkby (Best Live Action Short Film) - The Phone Call
 Paul Franklin (Best Visual Effects) - Interstellar
 Paweł Pawlikowski (Best Foreign Language Film) - Ida

British nominations:

 Boogaloo and Graham (Best Live Action Short Film)
 Guardians of the Galaxy (Best Makeup and Hairstyling, Best Visual Effects)
 Ida (Best Cinematography)
 Interstellar (Best Original Score, Best Sound Editing, Best Sound Mixing, Best Production Design)
 Into the Woods (Best Actress, Best Production Design, Best Costume Design)
 Maleficent (Best Costume Design)
 Mr. Turner (Best Original Score, Best Production Design, Best Cinematography, Best Costume Design)
 Room (Best Adapted Screenplay, Best Director, Best Picture)
 Selma (Best Picture)
 The Bigger Picture (Best Animated Short Film)
 The Grand Budapest Hotel (Best Picture, Best Directing, Best Original Screenplay, Best Cinematography, Best Film Editing)
 The Imitation Game (Best Picture, Best Directing, Best Actor, Best Supporting Actress, Best Original Score, Best Production Design, Best Film Editing)
 The Theory of Everything (Best Picture, Best Actress, Best Adapted Screenplay, Best Original Score)
 Virunga (Best Documentary – Feature)
 X-Men: Days of Future Past (Best Visual Effects)
 Barney Pilling (Best Film Editing) - The Grand Budapest Hotel
 Benedict Cumberbatch (Best Actor) - The Imitation Game
 Christian Colson (Best Picture) - Selma
 David White (Best Makeup and Hairstyling) - Guardians of the Galaxy
 Dick Pope (Best Cinematography) - Mr. Turner
 Eric Fellner (Best Picture) - The Theory of Everything
 Felicity Jones (Best Actress) - The Theory of Everything
 Gary Yershon (Best Original Score) - Mr. Turner
 Jacqueline Durran (Best Costume Design) - Mr. Turner
 Keira Knightley (Best Supporting Actress) - The Imitation Game
 Michael Lennox (Best Live Action Short Film) - Boogaloo and Graham
 Nathan Crowley (Best Production Design) - Interstellar
 Paul Corbould (Best Visual Effects) - Guardians of the Galaxy
 Roger Deakins (Best Cinematography) - Unbroken
 Rosamund Pike (Best Actress) - Gone Girl
 Tim Bevan (Best Picture) - The Theory of Everything
 Tomm Moore (Best Animated Feature Film) - Song of the Sea

British Academy Film Awards
The 68th British Academy Film Awards were held on 8 February 2015.

British winners:

 Boogaloo and Graham (Best Short Film)
 Citizenfour (Best Documentary)
 Ida (Best Film Not in the English Language)
 Interstellar (Best Special Visual Effects)
 Pride (Outstanding Debut by a British Writer, Director or Producer)
 Room (Best Actress)
 The Bigger Picture (Best Short Animation)
 The Grand Budapest Hotel (Best Original Screenplay, Best Original Music, Best Production Design, Best Costume Design, Best Makeup and Hair)
 The Theory of Everything (Best Actor in a Leading Role, Best Adapted Screenplay, Outstanding British Film)
 Andrew Lockley (Best Special Visual Effects) - Interstellar
 Ben Wilkins (Best Sound) - Whiplash
 David Livingstone (Outstanding Debut by a British Writer, Director or Producer) - Pride
 Eddie Redmayne (Best Actor in a Leading Role) - The Theory of Everything
 Eric Fellner (Outstanding British Film) - The Theory of Everything
 Jack O'Connell (EE Rising Star Award)
 James Marsh (Outstanding British Film) - The Theory of Everything
 Julianne Moore (Best Actress in a Leading Role) - Still Alice
 Mark Coulier (Best Makeup and Hair) - The Grand Budapest Hotel
 Michael Lennox (Best Short Film) - Boogaloo and Graham
 Mike Leigh (Academy Fellowship)
 Paul Franklin (Best Special Visual Effects) - Interstellar
 Paweł Pawlikowski (Best Film Not in the English Language) - Ida
 Stephen Beresford (Outstanding Debut by a British Writer, Director or Producer) - Pride
 Tim Bevan (Outstanding British Film) - The Theory of Everything
 BBC Films (Outstanding British Contribution to Cinema)

British nominations:

 20,000 Days on Earth (Best Documentary)
 '71 (Outstanding Debut by a British Writer, Director or Producer, Outstanding British Film)
 Guardians of the Galaxy (Best Special Visual Effects, Best Makeup and Hair)
 Ida (Best Cinematography)
 Interstellar (Best Cinematography, Best Original Music, Best Production Design)
 Into the Woods (Best Costume Design, Best Makeup and Hair)
 Kajaki (Outstanding Debut by a British Writer, Director or Producer)
 Lilting (Outstanding Debut by a British Writer, Director or Producer)
 Mr. Turner (Best Cinematography, Best Production Design, Best Costume Design, Best Makeup and Hair)
 Northern Soul (Outstanding Debut by a British Writer, Director or Producer)
 Paddington (Best Adapted Screenplay, Outstanding British Film)
 Pride (Best Actress in a Supporting Role, Outstanding British Film)
 Room (Best Adapted Screenplay)
 The Grand Budapest Hotel (Best Film, Best Director, Best Actor in a Leading Role, Best Cinematography, Best Sound, Best Editing)
 The Imitation Game (Best Film, Best Actor in a Leading Role, Best Actress in a Supporting Role, Best Adapted Screenplay, Outstanding British Film, Best Sound, Best Production Design, Best Costume Design, Best Editing)
 The Theory of Everything (Best Film, Best Director, Best Actress in a Leading Role, Best Original Music, Best Costume Design, Best Makeup and Hair, Best Editing)
 Trash (Best Film Not in the English Language)
 Under the Skin (Outstanding British Film, Best Original Music)
 Virunga (Best Documentary)
 X-Men: Days of Future Past (Best Special Visual Effects)
 Ainslie Henderson (Best Short Animation) - Monkey Love Experiments
 Andrew de Lotbiniere (Outstanding Debut by a British Writer, Director or Producer) - Kajaki
 Barney Pilling (Best Editing) - The Grand Budapest Hotel
 Benedict Cumberbatch (Best Actor in a Leading Role) - The Imitation Game
 David Heyman (Outstanding British Film) - Paddington
 David White (Best Makeup and Hair) - Guardians of the Galaxy
 Dick Pope (Best Cinematography) - Mr. Turner
 Elaine Constantine (Outstanding Debut by a British Writer, Director or Producer) - Northern Soul
 Eric Fellner (Best Film) - The Theory of Everything / (Best Film Not in the English Language) - Trash
 Felicity Jones (Best Actress in a Leading Role) - The Theory of Everything
 Gregory Burke (Outstanding Debut by a British Writer, Director or Producer, Outstanding British Film) - '71
 Gugu Mbatha-Raw (EE Rising Star Award)
 Hong Khaou (Outstanding Debut by a British Writer, Director or Producer) - Lilting
 Iain Forsyth (Best Documentary) - 20,000 Days on Earth
 Imelda Staunton (Best Actress in a Supporting Role) - Pride
 James Marsh (Best Director) - The Theory of Everything
 John Midgley (Best Sound) - The Imitation Game
 Jane Pollard (Best Documentary) - 20,000 Days on Earth
 Jacqueline Durran (Best Costume Design) - Mr. Turner
 Jonathan Glazer (Outstanding British Film) - Under the Skin
 Keira Knightley (Best Actress in a Supporting Role) - The Imitation Game
 Matthew Warchus (Outstanding British Film) - Pride
 Mica Levi (Best Original Music) - Under the Skin
 Nathan Crowley (Best Production Design) - Interstellar
 Paul Katis (Outstanding Debut by a British Writer, Director or Producer) - Kajaki
 Paul King (Best Adapted Screenplay, Outstanding British Film) - Paddington
 Peter King (Best Makeup and Hair) - Into the Woods
 Ralph Fiennes (Best Actor in a Leading Role) - The Grand Budapest Hotel
 Rosamund Pike (Best Actress in a Leading Role) - Gone Girl
 Stephen Beresford (Outstanding British Film) - Pride
 Stephen Daldry (Best Film Not in the English Language) - Trash
 Tim Bevan (Best Film) - The Theory of Everything / (Best Film Not in the English Language) - Trash

Critics' Choice Awards
The 20th Critics' Choice Awards were held on 15 January 2015.

British winners:

 Guardians of the Galaxy (Best Action Movie, Best Hair & Makeup)
 Interstellar (Best Sci-Fi/Horror Movie)
 Room (Best Actress, Best Young Performer)
 Selma (Best Song)
 The Grand Budapest Hotel (Best Comedy, Best Art Direction, Best Costume Design)
 Emily Blunt (Best Actress in an Action Movie) - Edge of Tomorrow
 Julianne Moore (Best Actress) - Still Alice

British nominations:

 Citizenfour (Best Documentary Feature)
 Fury (Best Action Movie, Best Actor in an Action Movie)
 Guardians of the Galaxy (Best Actor in an Action Movie, Best Actress in an Action Movie, Best Visual Effects)
 Ida (Best Foreign Language Film)
 Interstellar (Best Young Actor/Actress, Best Art Direction, Best Cinematography, Best Editing, Best Visual Effects, Best Score)
 Into the Woods (Best Supporting Actress, Best Acting Ensemble, Best Art Direction, Best Costume Design, Best Hair & Makeup)
 Maleficent (Best Costume Design, Best Hair & Makeup)
 Mr. Turner (Best Cinematography, Best Costume Design)
 Room (Best Picture, Best Adapted Screenplay)
 Selma (Best Picture, Best Director, Best Actor, Best Acting Ensemble)
 The Grand Budapest Hotel (Best Picture, Best Director, Best Actor, Best Young Actor/Actress, Best Acting Ensemble, Best Original Screenplay, Best Actor in a Comedy, Best Cinematography)
 The Imitation Game (Best Picture, Best Actor, Best Supporting Actress, Best Acting Ensemble, Best Adapted Screenplay, Best Score)
 The Theory of Everything (Best Picture, Best Actor, Best Actress, Best Adapted Screenplay, Best Score)
 Under the Skin (Best Sci-Fi/Horror Movie)
 Atticus Ross (Best Score) - Gone Girl
 Benedict Cumberbatch (Best Actor) - The Imitation Game
 David Oyelowo (Best Actor) - Selma
 Dick Pope (Best Cinematography) - Mr. Turner
 Eddie Redmayne (Best Actor) - The Theory of Everything
 Felicity Jones (Best Actress) - The Theory of Everything
 Jacqueline Durran (Best Costume Design) - Mr. Turner
 Keira Knightley (Best Supporting Actress) - The Imitation Game / (Best Song) - Begin Again
 Nick Hornby (Best Adapted Screenplay) - Wild
 Ralph Fiennes (Best Actor, Best Actor in a Comedy) - The Grand Budapest Hotel
 Roger Deakins (Best Cinematography) - Unbroken
 Rosamund Pike (Best Actress) - Gone Girl
 Tilda Swinton (Best Supporting Actress) - Snowpiercer
 William Nicholson (Best Adapted Screenplay) - Unbroken

Golden Globe Awards
The 72nd Golden Globe Awards were held on 11 January 2015.

British winners:

 Room (Best Actress in a Motion Picture – Drama)
 Selma (Best Original Song)
 The Grand Budapest Hotel (Best Motion Picture - Musical or Comedy)
 The Theory of Everything (Best Actor - Motion Picture Drama, Best Original Score)
 Eddie Redmayne (Best Actor - Motion Picture Drama) - The Theory of Everything
 Julianne Moore (Best Actress - Motion Picture Drama) - Still Alice

British nominations:

 Ida (Best Foreign Language Film)
 Interstellar (Best Original Score)
 Into the Woods (Best Motion Picture - Musical or Comedy, Best Actress - Motion Picture Musical or Comedy, Best Supporting Actress)
 Pride (Best Motion Picture - Musical or Comedy)
 Room (Best Screenplay, Best Motion Picture – Drama)
 Selma (Best Motion Picture - Drama, Best Actor - Motion Picture Drama)
 The Grand Budapest Hotel (Best Actor - Motion Picture Musical or Comedy, Best Director, Best Screenplay)
 The Imitation Game (Best Motion Picture - Drama, Best Actor - Motion Picture Drama, Best Supporting Actress, Best Screenplay, Best Original Score)
 The Theory of Everything (Best Motion Picture - Drama, Best Actress - Motion Picture Drama)
 Atticus Ross (Best Original Score) - Gone Girl
 Benedict Cumberbatch (Best Actor - Motion Picture Drama) - The Imitation Game
 David Oyelowo (Best Actor - Motion Picture Drama) - Selma
 Emily Blunt (Best Actress - Motion Picture Musical or Comedy) - Into the Woods
 Felicity Jones (Best Actress - Motion Picture Drama) - The Theory of Everything
 Helen Mirren (Best Actress - Motion Picture Musical or Comedy) - The Hundred-Foot Journey
 Julianne Moore (Best Actress - Motion Picture Musical or Comedy) - Maps to the Stars
 Keira Knightley (Best Supporting Actress) - The Imitation Game
 Ralph Fiennes (Best Actor - Motion Picture Musical or Comedy) - The Grand Budapest Hotel
 Rosamund Pike (Best Actress - Motion Picture Drama) - Gone Girl

Screen Actors Guild Awards
The 21st Screen Actors Guild Awards were held on 25 January 2015.

British winners:

 Room (Outstanding Performance by a Female Role in a Leading Role)
 The Theory of Everything (Outstanding Performance by a Male Actor in a Leading Role)
 Andrea Riseborough (Outstanding Performance by a Cast in a Motion Picture) - Birdman
 Eddie Redmayne (Outstanding Performance by a Male Actor in a Leading Role) - The Theory of Everything
 Julianne Moore (Outstanding Performance by a Female Actor in a Leading Role) - Still Alice
 Naomi Watts (Outstanding Performance by a Cast in a Motion Picture) - Birdman

British nominations:

 Fury (Outstanding Performance by a Stunt Ensemble in a Motion Picture)
 Get on Up (Outstanding Performance by a Stunt Ensemble in a Motion Picture)
 Into the Woods (Outstanding Performance by a Female Actor in a Supporting Role)
 Room (Outstanding Performance by a Male Actor in a Supporting Role)
 The Grand Budapest Hotel (Outstanding Performance by a Cast in a Motion Picture)
 The Imitation Game (Outstanding Performance by a Male Actor in a Leading Role, Outstanding Performance by a Female Actor in a Supporting Role, Outstanding Performance by a Cast in a Motion Picture)
 The Theory of Everything (Outstanding Performance by a Female Actor in a Leading Role, Outstanding Performance by a Cast in a Motion Picture)
 X-Men: Days of Future Past (Outstanding Performance by a Stunt Ensemble in a Motion Picture)
 Benedict Cumberbatch (Outstanding Performance by a Male Actor in a Leading Role, Outstanding Performance by a Cast in a Motion Picture) - The Imitation Game
 Charles Dance (Outstanding Performance by a Cast in a Motion Picture) - The Imitation Game
 Charlie Cox (Outstanding Performance by a Cast in a Motion Picture) - The Theory of Everything
 David Thewlis (Outstanding Performance by a Cast in a Motion Picture) - The Theory of Everything
 Eddie Redmayne (Outstanding Performance by a Cast in a Motion Picture) - The Theory of Everything
 Emily Watson (Outstanding Performance by a Cast in a Motion Picture) - The Theory of Everything
 Felicity Jones (Outstanding Performance by a Female Actor in a Leading Role, Outstanding Performance by a Cast in a Motion Picture) - The Theory of Everything
 Jude Law (Outstanding Performance by a Cast in a Motion Picture) - The Grand Budapest Hotel
 Keira Knightley (Outstanding Performance by a Female Actor in a Supporting Role, Outstanding Performance by a Cast in a Motion Picture) - The Imitation Game
 Mark Strong (Outstanding Performance by a Cast in a Motion Picture) - The Imitation Game
 Matthew Beard (Outstanding Performance by a Cast in a Motion Picture) - The Imitation Game
 Matthew Goode (Outstanding Performance by a Cast in a Motion Picture) - The Imitation Game
 Naomi Watts (Outstanding Performance by a Female Actor in a Supporting Role) - St. Vincent
 Ralph Fiennes (Outstanding Performance by a Cast in a Motion Picture) - The Grand Budapest Hotel
 Rosamund Pike (Outstanding Performance by a Female Actor in a Leading Role) - Gone Girl
 Rory Kinnear (Outstanding Performance by a Cast in a Motion Picture) - The Imitation Game
 Simon McBurney (Outstanding Performance by a Cast in a Motion Picture) - The Theory of Everything
 Tilda Swinton (Outstanding Performance by a Cast in a Motion Picture) - The Grand Budapest Hotel
 Tom Wilkinson (Outstanding Performance by a Cast in a Motion Picture) - The Grand Budapest Hotel

Notable deaths

See also

 2015 in film
 2015 in British music
 2015 in British radio
 2015 in British television
 2015 in the United Kingdom
 List of 2015 box office number-one films in the United Kingdom
 List of British films of 2014
 List of British films of 2016

References

External links
 2015 in film
 List of 2015 box office number-one films in the United Kingdom

2015
Films
Lists of 2015 films by country or language